Frank Hill (born August 13, 1864) was a private serving in the United States Marine Corps during the Spanish–American War who received the Medal of Honor for bravery.

Biography
Hill was born August 13, 1864, in Hartford, Connecticut. He joined the Marine Corps from Portsmouth, Virginia in September 1896, and was honorably discharged in October 1901. Hill later joined the Army, and was discharged for disability in 1903 at Benicia, California.

Medal of Honor citation
Rank and organization: Private, U.S. Marine Corps. Born: 13 August 1864, Hartford, Conn. Accredited to: Connecticut. G.O. No.: 521, 7 July 1899.

Citation:

On board the U.S.S. Nashville during the operation of cutting the cable leading from Cienfuegos, Cuba, 11 May 1898. Facing the heavy fire of the enemy, Hill displayed extraordinary bravery and coolness throughout this action.

See also

List of Medal of Honor recipients for the Spanish–American War

References

External links

1864 births
Year of death missing
United States Marine Corps Medal of Honor recipients
United States Marines
American military personnel of the Spanish–American War
Spanish–American War recipients of the Medal of Honor
Military personnel from Hartford, Connecticut